Albert Denny (3 January 1886 – 1965) was a British cyclist. He competed in two events at cycling at the 1908 Summer Olympics: the men's sprint and the men's 20 kilometres.

References

External links
 
 London 1908 / Cycling Track / 20km men at the International Olympic Committee

1886 births
1965 deaths
British male cyclists
Olympic cyclists of Great Britain
Cyclists at the 1908 Summer Olympics
Place of birth missing
20th-century British people